The Interdisciplinary Council on Developmental and Learning Disorders (ICDL) is a nonprofit organization founded by Stanley Greenspan and Serena Wieder for identification, prevention, and treatment of developmental and learning disorders.

External links

Non-profit organizations based in Maryland
Learning disabilities
Medical and health organizations based in Maryland